Although Puerto Rico did not participate in the November 8, 2016, general election because it is a territory and not a state, the five non-incorporated territories that send delegates to the United States House of Representatives participated in the presidential primaries.

In the presidential primaries, Puerto Rico voters expressed their preferences for the Democratic and Republican parties' respective nominees for president. Registered members of each party only voted in their party's primary, while voters who were unaffiliated chose any one primary in which to vote. There were 60 Democratic delegates and 23 Republican delegates to be allocated.

Primary elections

Republican primary 

The Republican primary took place on March 6, 2016:
Twelve candidates appeared on the Republican presidential primary ballot, with only four still possessing active campaigns:
Marco Rubio, Donald Trump, Ted Cruz, and John Kasich

Sen. Marco Rubio carried the primary with 73.8% of the vote and was awarded all 23 delegates due to the territory's 50% winner-take-all threshold.

Democratic caucus 

The Democratic caucus took place on June 5, 2016.

See also
 Democratic Party presidential debates, 2016
 Democratic Party presidential primaries, 2016
 Republican Party presidential debates, 2016
 Republican Party presidential primaries, 2016

References

External links
 RNC 2016 Republican Nominating Process 
 Green papers for 2016 primaries, caucuses, and conventions

Puerto Rico
2016
March 2016 events in the United States
June 2016 events in the United States